Joseph Ma Zhongmu (1 November 1919 – 25 March 2020) was a Chinese Roman Catholic bishop.

Biography
Ma Zhongmu was born in China and was ordained to the priesthood in 1947. He served as bishop of the Roman Catholic Diocese of Ningxia, China, from 1983 to 2005. Ma Zhongmu was clandestinely ordained a bishop.

He was interred in a forced labor camp from 1958 to 1969 for his refusal to support the Catholic Patriotic Association. He was the only bishop of Mongolian ethnicity and translated the Roman Catholic Missal into his native language, but it was never approved by the Holy See.

References

1919 births
2020 deaths
21st-century Roman Catholic bishops in China
Chinese centenarians
20th-century Roman Catholic bishops in China
Men centenarians